The American publisher Boom! Studios has published a range of comic books and graphic novels.

#

A

B

C

D

E

F

G

H

I

J

K

L

M

N

O

P

R

S

T

U

V

W

X

Z

References

Lists of publications